José Francisco Madero Gaxiola y San Martín (died 1833) was a Mexican surveyor and land commissioner. He was the father of Evaristo Madero Elizondo and great-grandfather of Francisco I. Madero, leader of the Mexican Revolution and president of Mexico.

He was also the founder of Liberty, Texas, when Texas was still a part of Mexico.

He died during a cholera epidemic in the Mexican state of Coahuila on September 26, 1833.

See also
José María Jesús Carbajal Helped Madero survey East Texas

References

Guerra de Luna, Manuel (2010). Los Madero, la Saga Liberal, Siglo Bicentenario.

1833 deaths
Date of birth unknown
Deaths from cholera
Infectious disease deaths in Mexico
Surveyors